Praise (formerly Praise the Lord) is a Christian-oriented talk program which is the flagship program of the Trinity Broadcasting Network (TBN), airing every weeknight in primetime.  TBN president Matt Crouch and his wife Laurie serve as the primary hosts of the show. On November 14, 2016, the title was changed to the shortened title Praise.

Premise
Originally hosted by TBN founders Paul and Jan Crouch, and later by Paul Crouch Jr., the program features a mix of interviews with celebrities and other performers discussing faith-based topics and their personal relationship with faith, and music performances from various gospel and contemporary Christian artists. It was originally 2 hours, which shifted to 90 minutes, as well as moved to a new timeslot. The program usually originates from the network's Trinity Christian City campus in Costa Mesa, California, though other episodes also originate from TBN's facilities in Irving, Texas, the Trinity Music City complex in Hendersonville, Tennessee, and the Holy Land Experience in Orlando, Florida.

A localized version Praise the Lord is utilized by TBN's owned-and-operated stations and affiliates to fulfill local or educational programming requirements.

Theme and announcer
Jim McClellan has served as the program's announcer for nearly 40 years. Rich Cook serves as the composer of the show's theme music used since 1992, which includes three versions of varying length and an alternate version utilizing a saxophone.

The 1981-1992 TBN Praise the Lord theme song was composed and arranged by Rich Cook.

References

External links

Trinity Broadcasting Network original programming
1973 American television series debuts
1980s American television series
1990s American television series
2000s American television series
2010s American television series
2020s American television series
Christian entertainment television series